Julius Naue (17 June 1835, Köthen – 14 March 1907, Munich) was a German painter, illustrator and archaeologist.

A student of  August von Kreling, he came to work for  Moritz von Schwind in Munich where he remained until 1866.
As an archaeologist, Naue held a presentation on prehistoric swords (Die prähistorischen Schwerter), specifically Bronze Age swords, for the Anthropological Society in Munich in 1884. The "Naue" type of Bronze Age swords is named in his honour.
Naue was an autodidact, and published various smaller treatises for which he proceeded to compile in a dissertation at Tübingen University in 1887,  Die Hügelgräber zwischen Ammer- und Staffelsee'.
He also planned a multi-volume work on "The Bronze Age in Upper Bavaria", but only published the first volume in 1894.

Notable paintings

 Verkündigung Mariae (1862)
 Die nordische Sage (1864)
 Der Krötenring (1865)
 Das Märchen von Kaiser Heinrich I. und der Prinzessin Ilse (1866)
 Das Schicksal der Götter nach der Deutschen Heldensage (1877)
 Helgi und Sigrun" (1879)

Gallery 

Publications
 Die Hügelgräber zwischen Ammer- und Staffelsee. Stuttgart 1887.
Naue (J.), 1888a, “Prae-historic and Ethnographic Studies. The Copper Bronze and Iron Weapons of Cyprus”, The Owl. Science, Literature and Art, No. 2, 15 September, 9-15.
Naue (J.), 1888b, “Prae-historic and Ethnographic Studies. The Copper Bronze and Iron Weapons of Cyprus”, in The Owl. Science, Literature and Art, No. 3, 29 September, 17-23.
Naue (J.), 1888c, “Prae-historic and Ethnographic Studies. The Copper Bronze and Iron Weapons of Cyprus”, The Owl. Science, Literature and Art, No. 4, 13 October, 25-29.
 Die Bronzezeit in Oberbayern – Ergebnisse der Ausgrabungen und Untersuchungen von Hügelgräbern der Bronzezeit zwischen Ammer- und Staffelsee und in der Nähe des Starnbergersees. Band 1, München, Piloty & Löhle, 1894.
 Die Vorrömischen Schwerter aus Kupfer, Bronze und Eisen. München, Verlag du K. Priv. Kunst. Anstalt Pilot, & Lochk., 1903.
Links
 "The Lost Masterpieces of Julius Naue, including a Biography and Bibliography of the Prolific History Painter."

References

Mark Schmid: Alte Akten - Neue Gräber? Marginalien zu Julius Naue und Johannes Dorn. In: Hans-Peter Wotzka (ed.): Grundlegungen. Beiträge zur europäischen und afrikanischen Archäologie für Manfred K. H. Eggert. Tübingen 2006, 27-40.

Archaeologists from Saxony-Anhalt
19th-century German painters
19th-century German male artists
German male painters
20th-century German painters
20th-century German male artists
German illustrators
1835 births
1907 deaths